This is a list of television channels that broadcast in Welsh language.

Current channels 
S4C: general entertainment channel, news, documentaries, children's programmes, dramas, sport and films broadcasting in Wales.
Cyw: Children's channel on satellite with programmes in Welsh, with a range of home-produced and foreign dubbed programmes.
Bay TV Swansea: private television station in the Swansea Bay area. Mainly broadcasts in English, but has Welsh-language programming.

Previous channels 
S4C 2: Welsh parliament channel, broadcasting in both Welsh and English between September 1999 and December 2010.
S4C Clirlun was a high-definition service simulcasting S4C's main channel between 30 April 2010 and July 2012.

See also 
List of Welsh-language programmes
Television in Wales
List of television channels in Celtic languages

External links 
S4C website
Cyw website

Television in Wales
Welsh